Nora (also transliterated: Norah) is the second largest island in the Dahlak Archipelago, Eritrea, and one of the three inhabited islands of the archipelago. It has an area of 105.15 km. It reaches a maximum height of 37 meters in the northeast.

In 2009 the island had a population of 373 in 66 households.

References 

Dahlak Archipelago
Northern Red Sea Region
Islands of Eritrea
Islands of the Red Sea